Clonia may refer to:

 Clonia (bush cricket), a genus of predatory katydids in the subfamily Saginae
 Clonia (Hemiclonia), a subgenus of predatory katydids in the subfamily Saginae
 Clonia (nymph), a nymph in Greek mythology, consort of Hyrieus